Michael or Mike Watson may refer to:

Michael Watson (born 1965), English boxer
Michael Watson (athlete) (born 1958), Bermudan middle-distance runner
Michael Watson (cyclist) (born 1938), Hong Kong Olympic cyclist
Michael Watson (lacrosse) (born 1974), American lacrosse player
Michael Watson (Mississippi politician), Mississippi politician
Michael Watson (Virginia politician) (born 1961), Virginia politician
Michael H. Watson (born 1956), U.S. federal judge
Mike Watson, Baron Watson of Invergowrie (born 1949), Scottish politician and peer
Mike Watson (poker player) (born 1984), Canadian professional poker player 
Mike Watson, bassist for American metal band, Dangerous Toys
Mick Watson (born 1966), New Zealand businessman
Mike Watson (American football), American football coach
Mike Watson, character in 100 Feet
Michael Robert Watson (born 1979), British-born curator, art critic and theorist
B. Michael Watson (born 1949), United Methodist Church bishop

See also 
Watson (surname)